Liechtenstein Homeland Service (LHD) was a political party in Liechtenstein that advocated corporate statism and the abolition of party politics. 

Established in the autumn of 1933, the party's positions began to radicalize and move toward Nazi ideas within a few months of existence. By December 1933, this radicalization caused some members (such as co-founder Eugen Schafhauser) to abandon the party. 

LHD merged with the Christian-Social People's Party (VP) in 1936 to form the Patriotic Union (VU).

References 

1933 establishments in Liechtenstein
1936 disestablishments in Liechtenstein
Defunct political parties in Liechtenstein
Nazi parties
Political parties established in 1933
Political parties disestablished in 1936